= Siloi =

Town of ancient Caria

Siloi was a town of ancient Caria. Its name does not appear in ancient authors, but is inferred from epigraphic evidence. It was a polis (city-state) and a member of the Delian League.

Its site is unlocated.
